Iolaus bakeri, the Baker's sapphire , is a butterfly in the family Lycaenidae. It is found in Zimbabwe, Mozambique, Malawi, Zambia and the Democratic Republic of the Congo (Shaba and Kivu).

Adults are on wing year round.

The larvae feed on Tapinanthus oleifolius.

References

Butterflies described in 1928
Iolaus (butterfly)